Symphony of Enchanted Lands II – The Dark Secret is the sixth studio album released by Rhapsody in 2004. A concept album like all previous albums of the band, it is not a sequel to Symphony of Enchanted Lands but the first chapter of the band's new saga, The Dark Secret Saga, which would conclude with their ninth album From Chaos to Eternity.

Christopher Lee provides the spoken narration throughout this album. He is also a guest singer in the single version of the song "The Magic of the Wizard's Dream".

It is the last studio release of the band under the name Rhapsody. They changed their named to Rhapsody of Fire in 2006.

Concept 
The album begins with the tale of "The Seven Black Books" written by Nekron, son of the Hell God Kron. The books, written with angel blood and then becoming indestructible, tell a part of a prophecy known as the Dark Secret. The prophecy would one day awaken the seven demons who would open the gates to hell, releasing every kind of ancient monster, alive and dead. Nekron would then be reborn to reign again in the unholy name of cosmic chaos, "And this time, he would reign supreme." ("The Dark Secret - Ira Divina")

A search for the books was conducted. Through the ages, six of the books were found; however, the seventh book, containing the secrets on how to resurrect Nekron, remained unfound. Nevertheless, there was still hope. After he discovered the black books, an angel named Erian had a vision where the Gods of Cosmic Light told him how to stop the prophecy. Erian then wrote, in his own blood, the White Book which revealed how to stop the prophecy. The book represented a threat to the hellish prophecy and to Nekron's resurrection and then, in the age of the Red Moon, 3000 years before, the Lords of the Darklands won their battle against the Army of the Nordic Plains and found Erian's Mystical Book in Ainor's sacred halls. The book was then hidden in the Darklands, in a place known only by the master wizards of the Black Order.

There was hope, however, that the seventh black book held a clue as to where Erian's White Book was hidden, and so The White Dragon's Order, an order dedicated to protect the Enchanted Lands from the Darklands, was founded. A man named Iras Algor wanted to lead a search for the seventh black book. However, no one knew of a way into the darklands. Iras Algor then recalled that Aresius had told him to search for Dargor. Surely he knew the way. There were many objections to this, but Dargor was their only hope, and so Iras Algor, the hero Khaas, princess Lothen and the elven king Tarish, led by Dargor, set out to find the seventh black book hidden in the caves of Dar-Kunor. ("Erian's Mystical Rhymes - The White Dragon's Order") They took the pass of Erloria, the safer way to reach the grey mountains. ("The Last Angels' Call") At the beginning the journey was full of wonderful visions, in the Dragonlands they found a lot of lovely creatures. But after ten days this sight was over and, when they finally reach the falls of Erloria, the sunlight was over. ("Dragonland's Rivers")

Now they were near the grey mountains. The path was full of rocks, the air was cold, but Dargor lead them through all these dangers. They also had to hide from the Black Order, the soldiers of Nekron. That night, in a magical vision, the father of Dargor, Vankar, appeared to the shadowlord. He reminded Dargor that he was half demon, and now he was a betrayer. Dargor faced him, even when he knew it was the truth. ("Sacred Power of Raging Winds")

Then, Iras led them to the mountains of Erinor, the only passage known to men in the plains of the Darklands. When they reached Hargor, it was time for Tarish, the elven king, to find a way through the caverns to Dar Kunor's entrance. The journey was dangerous, but Dargor protected them those two days. Finally they saw in the black and evil marsh, there lied the passageway between snakes and hellish mud. They saw the Dar Kunor river. Tarish knew that the only way was through the black ice water. He dived into the marshes and he soon disappeared. But he soon returned, with good news: he had found the entrance to Dar Kunor. ("Shadows of Death") The heroes take a short rest in the Grey Mountains before entering Dar Kunor. ("Nightfall on the Grey Mountains")

Track listing

Personnel 
Credits for Symphony of Enchanted Lands II – The Dark Secret adapted from liner notes.

Rhapsody of Fire
 Fabio Lione – lead vocals
 Luca Turilli – guitars, production
 Alex Staropoli – keyboards, orchestral arrangements, production
 Patrice Guers – bass
 Alex Holzwarth – drums

Additional musicians
 Manuel Staropoli – baroque recorder
 Christopher Lee – narration
 Toby Eddington – narration
 Dominique Leurquin – guitars (rhythm)
 Johannes Monno – guitars (classical)
 Stefan Horz – harpsichord
 Søren Leupold – lute
 Paulina van Laarhoven – viola
 Bridget Fogle – soprano vocals, choir vocals

Choir
 Cinzia Rizzo, Gerit Göbel, Miro Rodenberg, Olaf Hayer, Previn Moore, Robert Hunecke-Rizzo, Thomas Rettke

Brno Academy Choir
 Dana Kurečková, Iva Holubová, Jana Klinerová, Jaroslava Zezulová, Kateřina Hudcová, Lucie Matalová, Ludmila Kieseljovová, Ludmila Markesová, Vladimíra Dolejšová, Jiří Klecker, Karel Seffer, Libor Markes, Michael Pinsker, Milan Hanzliczek, Pavel Konárek, Robert Kurečka, Serhij Derda, Tomáš Ibrmajer, Vladimír Kutnohorský, Alena Sobolová, Andrea Dáňová, Barbora Francová, Dana Toncrová, Eva Badalová, Eva Klepalová, Kateřina Nejedlá, Kateřina Pastrňáková, Magda Krejčová, Marie Vališová, Petra Bodová, Petra Koňárková, Terezie Kamenická, Terezie Plevová, Zora Jaborníková, Ivan Nepivoda, Jakub Herzan, Jiří Barták, Marek Mikuš, Matěj Dupal, Tomáš Kamenický, Vladimír Prachař, Vít Matuška

Bohuslav Martinů Philharmonic Orchestra

 Emil Nosek – violin
 František Hrubý – violin
 Hana Roušarová – violin
 Hana Tesařová – violin
 Jan Nedoma – violin
 Jana Štípková – violin
 Jitka Hanáková – violin
 Milan Lapka – violin
 Miroslav Křivánek – violin
 Přemysl Roušar – violin
 Dana Blahutová – violin
 Hana Bílková – violin
 Jan Kotulan – violin
 Jaroslav Aladzas – violin
 Jitka Šuranská – violin
 Josef Geryk – violin
 Josef Kubelka – violin
 Josef Vyžrálek – violin
 Leo Sláma – violin
 Yvona Fialová – violin
 Dana Božková – viola
 Juraj Petrovič – viola
 Lucie Dümlerová – viola

 Michaela Slámová – viola
 Miroslav Kašný – viola
 Oldřich Šebestík – viola
 Pavel Novák – viola
 Roman Janů – viola
 Alexandr Erml – celli
 David Kefer – celli
 Erich Hulín – celli
 Hana Škarpová – celli
 Zdenka Aladzasová – celli
 Zuzana Ermlová – celli
 Josef Horák – double bass
 Michal Pášma – double bass
 Pavel Juřík – double bass
 Vladimír Hudeček – double bass
 Vítězslav Pelikán – double bass
 Jana Holásková – flute
 Jiřina Vodičková – flute
 Vladimír Vodička – flute
 Krista Hallová – oboe
 Svatopluk Holásek – oboe
 Aleš Pavlorek – clarinet
 Jiří Kundl – clarinet

 Jaroslav Janoštík – bassoon
 Václav Kaniok – bassoon
 František Vyskočil – French horn
 Jiří Zatloukal – French horn
 Josef Číhal – French horn
 Milan Kubát – French horn
 Rudolf Linner – French horn
 Vlastimil Kelar – French horn
 Pavel Skopal – trumpet
 Rostislav Killar – trumpet
 Zdeněk Macek – trumpet
 Ivan Dřínovský – trombone
 Milan Tesař – trombone
 Roman Sklenář – trombone
 Miloslav Žváček – tuba
 Lucie Vápová – harp

Production

 Sascha Paeth – mixing, engineering
 Rob La Vaque – engineering
 Filip Heurckmans – mastering
 Stefan Schmidt – engineering (orchestra)
 Bernd Kugler – engineering (orchestra)
 Jan Wrede – engineering (orchestra)
 Marc Lenz – engineering (orchestra)
 Joey DeMaio – executive producer

 Petr Pololáník – orchestra conductor
 Jaroslav Kyzlink – choir conductor
 Marek Obdržálek – orchestra director
 Marc Klinnert – artwork, design
 Eric Philippe – logo
 Karsten vom Wege – design
 Karsten Koch – photography

Charts

References 

2004 albums
Rhapsody of Fire albums
Concept albums